Bohumil "Bohuš" Záhorský (5 February 1906 – 22 September 1980) was a Czechoslovak actor. He appeared in more than one hundred films from 1932 to 1980.

Selected filmography

References

External links 

1906 births
1980 deaths
Male actors from Prague
Czechoslovak male actors
Burials at Vyšehrad Cemetery